The 1955 Western Michigan Broncos football team represented Western Michigan College (renamed Western Michigan University in 1957) in the Mid-American Conference (MAC) during the 1955 college football season.  In their third season under head coach Jack Petoskey, the Broncos compiled a 1–7–1 record (0–5 against MAC opponents), finished in seventh place in the MAC, and were outscored by their opponents, 200 to 80.  The team played its home games at Waldo Stadium in Kalamazoo, Michigan.

Guard Jim Devine and quarterback Jerry Ganzel were the team captains. Fullback Charles Nidiffer received the team's most outstanding player award.

Schedule

References

Western Michigan
Western Michigan Broncos football seasons
Western Michigan Broncos football